Tailly is a commune in the Somme department in Hauts-de-France in northern France.

Geography

Population

Places of interest
The eighteenth-century château and park. Family home of Marshal Leclerc de Hauteclocque. Exhibition of the story of the liberation of France in 1944.

Personalities
Genéral Philippe Leclerc de Hauteclocque, Marshal of France.

See also
Communes of the Somme department

References

Communes of Somme (department)